Prismostictoides is a monotypic moth genus in the family Endromidae. The genus was erected by Vadim V. Zolotuhin and Tran Thieu Du in 2011. Its only species, Prismostictoides unihyala, was described by Zhu and Wang in 1995. It is found in Fujian, China.

References

 , 2011: A new species of the Bombycidae (Lepidoptera) for the fauna of Vietnam with erection of a new genus, and remarks on biology of Prismosticta Butler, 1880. Tinea 21 (4): 179-183.

Endromidae
Monotypic moth genera